Waldemar Kaminski (July 23, 1917 near Albany, New York – June 21, 2006, Buffalo, New York) was a grocer and anonymous philanthropist in Buffalo.  After his death, it was revealed that he had anonymously given millions of dollars to Buffalo charities over the years.

Kaminski was a first sergeant in the United States Army from 1941 to 1946, responsible for training new soldiers.  He ran a food stand in Broadway Market, Buffalo for more than 50 years.

References

1917 births
2006 deaths
United States Army personnel of World War II
Philanthropists from New York (state)
Businesspeople from Buffalo, New York
Activists from New York (state)
20th-century American philanthropists
20th-century American businesspeople
United States Army soldiers